Chrysallida africana is a species of sea snail, a marine gastropod mollusk in the family Pyramidellidae, the pyrams and their allies. It is one of many species of the large Chrysallida genus of gastropods. The species was named 'Africana' in honor of the continent, Africa, as the species is mostly distributed throughout marine terrain off the coasts of South Africa and the Cape of Good Hope.

References

External links
 To World Register of Marine Species

africana
Gastropods described in 1996